Howard B. Tinberg (born  March 6, 1953) is professor of English at Bristol Community College, Fall River, Massachusetts, United States.

Teacher
Tinberg teaches composition and literature, and encourages  ethnographic research by his students into literacy among their families and communities.

Awards
He was awarded the title Outstanding Community College Professor of 2004 by the Carnegie Foundation.

He is a former Chair of the Conference on College Composition and Communication, the premier, national organization for teachers of college writing.

He was selected as  Museum Teaching Fellow at the US Holocaust Memorial Museum.

He is a recipient of the Nell Ann Picket award for service to the two-year college.

His essay, “Reconsidering Transfer at the Community College: Challenges and Opportunities,” received the Mark Reynolds award for best article of the year in the journal, “Teaching English in the Two-Year College.”

Editor
He is a former editor of the journal Teaching English in the Two-Year College.

Author
He has authored Writing With Consequence: What Writing Does in the Disciplines, and Border Talk: Writing and Knowing in the Two-Year College. He has co-authored or co-edited, “The Community College Writer: Exceeding Expectations,” “What is College-Level Writing, Vols, 1 and 2,” “Teaching Learning and the Holocaust,” and “Deep Reading: Teaching Reading in the Writing Classroom.”

References
 2004 Professor of the Year
 Bristol Community College

1953 births
Living people
People from Fall River, Massachusetts
American academics of English literature